Pallikkunnu Church, also known as Our Lady of Lourdes Church, is a pilgrim centre of North Kerala. This is a Latin Catholic church  The festival is on February 2 to 18. Main days are 10th and 11th.

Pallikkunnu Church was built by a French priest Fr. Jefreno in 1908. Approximate distance to the church from Kalpetta is 14 kilometers.

References

External links 

Pallikkunnu Church, Wayanad.co.in
wayanad way beyond /PALLIKUNNU CHURCH Wayanad
Pallikunnu Church Video by Illam creations

Churches in Wayanad district
Roman Catholic churches in Kerala
Roman Catholic churches completed in 1908
20th-century Roman Catholic church buildings in India